Stemmatopsis is a genus of air-breathing land snails, terrestrial pulmonate gastropod mollusks in the subfamily Streptaxinae of the family Streptaxidae.

Distribution 
The distribution of the genus Stemmatopsis includes:
 north Vietnam

Species
Species within the genus Stemmatopsis include:
 Stemmatopsis arcuatolabris Do Duc Sang, 2021
 Stemmatopsis dolium Do Duc Sang, 2021
 Stemmatopsis nangphaiensis Do Duc Sang & Do Van Nhuong, 2015
 Stemmatopsis poirieri Mabille, 1887
 Stemmatopsis vanhoensis Do Duc Sang & Do Van Nhuong, 2015

References

 Bank, R. A. (2017). Classification of the Recent terrestrial Gastropoda of the World. Last update: July 16th, 2017

Streptaxidae